The 1936 United States Senate election in Wyoming was held on November 3, 1936. First-term Republican Senator Robert D. Carey ran for re-election. In a rematch of the 1930 race, he once again faced Harry Schwartz, who had since been elected to the State Senate. Carey's fortunes turned considerably from six years prior; he lost re-election to Schwartz by a decisive margin as President Franklin D. Roosevelt defeated Republican presidential nominee Alf Landon in Wyoming in a landslide.

Democratic primary

Candidates
 Harry Schwartz, State Senator, 1930 Democratic nominee for the U.S. Senate
 John D. Clark, economics professor at the University of Nebraska 
 J. Kirk Baldwin, State Treasurer
 Anthony V. Radalj, executive board member of the United Mine Workers
 Charles Trenary, State Senator

Results

Republican Primary

Candidates
 Robert D. Carey, incumbent U.S. Senator
 A. F. Brubaker, rancher

Results

General election

Results

References

Wyoming
1936
1936 Wyoming elections